Presidential elections were held in Mongolia on 9 June 2021. 

The result was a victory for former prime minister Ukhnaagiin Khürelsükh of the Mongolian People's Party, who received 72% of the valid vote. The election was considered free and fair by OSCE. However, there was controversy as several opposition candidates were disqualified and former president Khaltmaagiin Battulga was barred from running for a second term.

Background
In April 2021, president Khaltmaagiin Battulga issued an emergency directive to disband the MPP "in order to safeguard the sovereignty and democracy of the country" after the MPP passed amendments to the constitution. The constitutional amendments, which took effect in May 2020, limited one's presidency to one term, making Battulga ineligible to re-run in the 2021 presidential election.

Electoral system
Following 2019 constitutional amendments, the President is elected using the two-round system for a six-year term, and may only serve one term. Previously, the term was of four years, renewable once Political parties with representation in the State Great Khural are allowed to nominate candidates. The elected president must resign from any political party before their inauguration. Presidents can be removed through a two-third majority votes by the State Great Khural if found guilty for abusing their powers or violating the presidential oath.

Articles 97.9 and 99.2 of the electoral law determines how votes are counted, with blank ballots taken into account when determining whether a candidate has crossed the 50% threshold. If no candidate receives a majority of all votes cast in the second round (including blank votes), article 8.6.2 of the electoral law requires fresh elections to be held.

Candidates
The General Elections Commission registered three candidates:

Ukhnaagiin Khürelsükh (Mongolian People's Party)
Sodnomzunduin Erdene (Democratic Party)
Dangaasürengiin Enkhbat (National Labour Party)

Oyungerel Tsedevdamba of the Democratic Party had been considered a potential candidate but she lost her bid in the primary to Erdene.

Opinion polls
Former Prime Minister Ukhnaagiin Khürelsükh led the opinion polls according to an MEC survey in April 2021.

Results
Polls opened at 7 AM in 2,087 polling stations across the country for the 2.1 million registered voters, with security measures due to the COVID-19 pandemic in Mongolia. Voting ended at 10 PM. Khürelsükh and Erdene voted in Ulaanbaatar while Enkhbat was diagnosed positive for COVID-19 and voted in the hospital where he was hospitalized.

References

Presidential election
Mongolia
Mongolia
Presidential elections in Mongolia